Erlalai is a large agricultural village, popular for its red soil. The village is centered around the road connecting Mallakam and Punnalaikkadduvan North.
The village is divided into Erlalai centre, Erlalai North  Erlalai South and Erlalai West.
The vegetables produced in the village are believed to be tastier due to its red soil. The manioc or Cassava produced in the village is particularly famous.

Notable people
P. Kanagasabapathy

K. Kunaratnam

References

Towns in Jaffna District
Valikamam North DS Division